The national rugby union teams of England and Argentina (Los Pumas) have been playing each other since 1978. The status of the first match is ambiguous, as Argentina awarded Test caps to its players but England did not (England sent a representative "England XV", not the 1st XV).

They have met in 25 matches recognised by both sides as Tests. The first match was on 30 May 1981 and was a 19–19 draw. The 1982 Falklands War between Britain and Argentina meant that their next encounter was not until 1990.

Excluding the ambiguous 1978 game, Argentina have played England 25 times with England winning 19, Argentina 5 with 1 drawn.

The rugby rivalry between the two countries is not known for being as intense as their football rivalry.

Summary

Overall

Records 
Note: Date shown in brackets indicates when the record was last set.

Results
Note: mon-English/Argentine stadiums indicated in brackets:

Non-test results
Below is a list of matches that Argentina has awarded matches test match status by virtue of awarding caps, but England did not.

List of series

Notes

References

 
England national rugby union team matches
Argentina national rugby union team matches
Rugby union rivalries in Argentina
Rugby union rivalries in England
Argentina–United Kingdom relations